Old Elbe Tunnel or St. Pauli Elbe Tunnel (German: Alter Elbtunnel colloquially or St. Pauli Elbtunnel officially) which opened in 1911, is a pedestrian and vehicle tunnel in Hamburg.  The 426 m (1,398 ft) long tunnel was a technical sensation; 24 m (80 ft) beneath the surface, two 6 m (20 ft) diameter tubes connect central Hamburg with the docks and shipyards on the south side of the river Elbe. This was a big improvement for tens of thousands of workers in one of the busiest harbors in the world.

Six large lifts on either side of the tunnel carry pedestrians and vehicles to the bottom. The two tunnels are both still in operation, though due to their limited capacity by today's standards, other bridges and tunnels have been built and taken over most of the traffic.

In 2008 approximately 300,000 cars, 63,000 bicycles, and 700,000 pedestrians used the tunnel. The tunnel is opened 24 hours for pedestrians and bicycles. For motorized vehicles, opening times are currently Monday to Friday from 5:20a.m. to 8:00p.m. and on Saturdays from 5:20a.m. to 4:00p.m.

History
On 22 July 1907 the construction, undertaken by Philipp Holzmann, started to connect the quarters of St. Pauli near the Landungsbrücken and Steinwerder.

Work was done under pressure because the tunnel was below the water table of the Elbe. This type of building technique was used in the 19th century, in large engineering excavations, such as with the piers of bridges and with tunnels, where caissons under pressure were used to keep water from flooding the excavations, such as the foundations of the Brooklyn Bridge in New York City.

Workers who spend time in high-pressure atmospheric pressure conditions are at risk when they return to the lower pressure outside the caisson without slowly reducing the surrounding pressure. Due to the problems associated with decompression sickness, many of the men working on the Elbe tunnel were affected by what was known at the time as "Caissons Disease". Of 4,400 workers three men died, 74 suffered severe cases and more than 600 came down with light symptoms.

The tunnel opened on 7 September 1911.

Modern usage
In the tunnel an art exhibition and a long-distance running event Elbtunnel-Marathon take place. In 2008 the tunnel participated in the Tag des offenen Denkmals ("Day of the open heritage site"), a Germany-wide annual event sponsored by the Deutsche Stiftung Denkmalschutz that opens cultural heritage sites to the public.

On the occasion of the reopening of the east tube (on May 22 and 23, 2019), the Hamburg University of Music and Drama and the Hamburg Port Authority organized 4 concerts "Symphony in the St. Pauli Elbtunnel" under the direction of Prof. Georg Hajdu. The pieces composed specifically for this space were orchestrated with strings, winds, accordion, percussion and vocals. For each of the 144 musicians distributed in the two tunnel tubes, the music was displayed in real time on tablets individually controlled by a server computer. The enthusiastic audience walked through the tube and everyone had a unique, individual listening and sound experience in space and time.

Media
The old tunnel has featured in several films including The Odessa File, Matchless, $, The American Friend (Der Amerikanische Freund) and Secret Agent Fireball.

The tunnel was also featured in the music video for "One (Always Hardcore)" by German band Scooter.

Decoration
The tunnel walls are decorated with glazed terra cotta ornaments displaying items related to the Elbe river. While most show fish or crabs, a few show different items like litter and rats, too.

See also
(New) Elbe Tunnel

References

Sources

External links

Pictures of the old Elbe Tunnel

Buildings and structures in Hamburg-Mitte
Heritage sites in Hamburg
Transport in Hamburg
Road tunnels in Germany
Tourist attractions in Hamburg
Tunnels completed in 1911
Elbe
1911 establishments in Germany